Suzhuang may refer to the following places in China:

 Suzhuang Station, Beijing
 Suzhuang Township, Qinshui County, Shanxi Province
 Suzhuang, Zhejiang, a town in Kaihua Country, Zhejiang Province